Avraham Weinroth (born 1963) is the owner and founder of  Avi Weinroth & Co. Law firm which specializes in litigation, real estate and commercial law.  Weinroth was a senior partner for 25 years in the office of Jacob Weinroth (his brother) and in 2013 established his own law firm.  Weinroth lectured on property law, banking law and corporate law at Tel-Aviv University and Peres Academic Center in Rehovot.  Weinroth is the author of 23 books and dozens of articles in the fields of law, thought and the Jewish view.

Biography 
Weinroth was born in Israel. He studied in Rav Amiel Yeshiva "Ha'Yishuv Ha'Hadash" and later at the high rabbinical college Yeshivat Ateret Israel in Jerusalem. He served in the Israel Defense Forces in the Military Rabbinate and was ordained as a rabbi in 1984. He received his LL.B and LL.M, (summa cum laude), from Bar-Ilan University and his JSD from Tel Aviv University (part of the research was done in the McGill University in Montreal Canda).  Weinroth's thesis for the master's degree was on "Exemption from income tax in regard of public institutions" under the instruction of Prof. A. Namdar. Weinroth's doctoral thesis was on "The Application of Public Administrative Law to Governmental Companies" – instructed by Prof. A. Rosen-Tsvi (o.b.m) and Prof. I. Haviv-Segal. Both were published as leading books in their fields. Weinroth wrote a book about bank guarantees which in cited by the courts, including the Supreme Court. Since then, he has published many books and dozens of articles.

Legal career
Weinroth interned at the law firm of Adv. Hanan Melcer,  today a Supreme Court judge and at S. Horowitz & Co.(Dr. Amnon Goldberg o.b.m).  Weinroth began practicing law in 1989 at Dr. J. Weinroth & Co. In 2013  Weinroth founded his own law firm. Weinroth acts as a legal advisor to the Magen David Adom, and used to act as a legal advisor of Amidar, and represented government companies such as: The national cisrael company of roads, Bezeq int. Professor at Tel Aviv university since 1996, teaches property law and corporate law. Since 2014, Member Professor at the Peres academic centerin Rehovot. Since 2018 Associate Professor. lectures also at training courses for judges and lawyers. 
At the same time, Weinroth has published many articles and books in various fields of law and Jewish thought. especially his series of the "In light of" including so far: In light of Maharal, In light of the Or Hachaim, In light of the Kdushat Levi, In light of Rabi Zadok Hacohen from Lublin and In light of Sfat emet.

Published works 
Weinroth is the author of books and numerous publications in law and Jewish Law as well as Jewish philosophy and thought. The following is a partial list of his books:
 Property law- fundamental chapters, second edition, Nevo, 2020.
 Governmental Corporations – The Application of Public Administrative Law, Bursi  Tel Aviv, 1995.
 Taxation of Non Profit Institutions (Income Tax and V.A.T), Choshen Lamishpat,  1992.
 Interest, Shoav Publishers Ltd., 1998.
 Loan Laws, co authored with  Barak Medina, Bursi Publishers, 2000.
 Conditioning Service by Service at a Banking Corporation, co authored with Boaz Edelstein, Shoav Publishers Ltd., 2001.
 'Property Law, The Israeli Bar Association, 2017.
 Bank Guarantees – Expanded Second Edition, Shoav Publishers Ltd., 2007.
 Feminism and Judaism, Yedioth Ahronoth Publishers, 2001.
 Theft and Plunder – Fundamental Chapters – Mosad Harav Kook I, 2002.
 Maamarei Avraham – Articles in Jewish Law,  1982.
 Spiritualism and Judaism – Ministry of Defense Publishers, as part of a series of the Broadcast University, 1996.
 Discretion in Halacha-Science Relations, Machshavot Publishers, 1992.
 Faith in G-D versus Human Effort (Bitahon ve Hishtadlut), 2006 (published by Feldheim). This book won the Jerusalem Prize for Torah and Literature 2008. It was published in English on 2013.
 Ya'akov Weinroth book (Nevo, 2021), co-editing with judge G. GONTOVNICK AND DR. H. ZICHERMAN. 
 The Value of Life in Jewish Law, Feldheim, 2010.
 Father's Wisdom: Articles Pertaining to Biblical Issues,  Shoav Publishers, 2013.
 Insights in Prayer:  Feldheim Publishers, 2014 in Hebrew and 2019 in English. 
 Modern issues in Halacha, Shoav Publishers, 2017.
 Due process of law,  Feldheim Publishers, 2017.
 "Insights of a defence attorney",  Feldheim Publishers, 2019.
 In light of K'dushat Levi, Feldhaim, second edition, 2020.
 In light of Ma'haral- about parashah and Moadim, Feldhaim, 2020.  Publish also in english : "By the light of the Maharal" ,Feldhaim, 2022. 
 In light of Rabi Tz'adok Ha'cohen from Lublin, Feldhaim, 2021. 
 In light of Or Ha'haim about parashah and Moadim based on the book Or Ha'haim, Feldhaim, 2021.
 In light of Sfat Emet -about parashah and Moadim, Feldhaim, 2022.

ARTICLES (partial list):

 Sovereignty with responsibility as a decision tool in a cross and collision along the validity of the pledge, law and business, vollume 27.
 Building rights- reinspection, Law, volume 51, 201.
 Expropriation for house building - take from the individual, for the individual, Sha'arey Mishpat.
 
 The requirement of writing in the land brokerage deal, Law and Business.
 The bank's obligation to the client in time of market crises.
 The bank's responsibility to the apartment purchasers and the land owners, Praklit, Articles and books. 
 The logic of delivery law as an explanation o the psak of Rashi in interest law, Ya'akov weinroth book, 2021.
 Breach of contract due to force majeure, T'humin 41, 2021.
 Good faith and purpose of pledge, Law office site. 
 "Zoom" and Judicial decisions, law office site. 
 Informed consent - is there an obligation to tell a patient the whole truth?, Asia- medical jernal- ethics and law (shlezinger institute). 
  recorded and printed letures
 The advocate point of view - the last lesture of DR. YA'AKOV WEINROTH Z"L.
 Prop. Avraham Weinroth's lessons at the law and order channel - Hebrew law.
 Lecture at the honorary conference to the DR. YA'AKOV WEINROTH Z"L BOOK.

Publications 
On Theft, Plunder, and what Lies between Them, Ministry of Justice
About the felony of attempt, Ministry of Justice
Revenge in the Punishment System, Ministry of Justice
Responsibility of an asset keeper on an Insured Property, Ministry of Justice.
Compensation for Violation of the Autonomy rights, Ministry of Justice.
Hindsight, Ministry of Justice.
Expropriation for a public purpose when the purpose is no longer valid, Ministry of Justice.
Women in Judicial Proceedings, Ministry of Justice .
 Risk of Life in Wartime, Ministry of Justice.
Torah and Derech Eretz – Studying a profession and secular studies, Ministry of Justice
The Value of Peace – as a basic norm, Ministry of Justice
Social Justice in the Halacha
Breaking a Commitment to Donate Bone Marrow "Asia", a periodical of Medicine, Ethics and Halacha (Shlezinger Institute), no. 89–90, Aug, 2011, Vol. 23.
 Legal and Ethical aspects of Doctors' strike: "Asia", a periodical of Medicine, Ethics and Halacha (Shlezinger Institute), no. 93–94, 2013.
 The Essence of the Priestly Blessing – A lesson in the memory of Rabbi Moshe Aharon Weinroth o.b.m.
 The Essence of Kaddish, Prof. Avi Weinroth – A lesson in memory of Rabbi Moshe Aharon Weinroth o.b.m.

References

External links 
 
 http://aviweinrothbooks.com
 Weinroth's book Feminism and Judaism
 דירוג החברות המובילות בישראל (Ranking of leading companies in Israel), Dun's 100 (Hebrew)
 Weinroth's page on Martindale
 Weinroth on Bloomberg Businessweek
 http://aviweinrothbooks.com/

1963 births
Living people
Israeli lawyers
Israeli Jews
Israeli legal scholars